Molecular Biology of the Cell is a biweekly peer-reviewed scientific journal published by the American Society for Cell Biology. It covers research on the molecular basis of cell structure and function. According to the Journal Citation Reports, the journal has a 2012 impact factor of 4.803. It was originally established as Cell Regulation in 1989.

The Editor-in-Chief is Matthew Welch (University of California, Berkeley). Previous Editors-in-Chief include: Erkki Ruoslahti (of Cell Regulation) and David Botstein and Keith Yamamoto (of MBoC) and their successors Sandra Schmid and David Drubin.

References

External links
 

American Society for Cell Biology
Molecular and cellular biology journals
English-language journals
Biweekly journals
Publications established in 1989
Academic journals published by learned and professional societies of the United States
1991 establishments in the United States